Hypericum umbraculoides is a species of flowering plant, a deciduous shrub in the St. John's wort family, Hypericaceae. It is the sole species in the section Hypericum sect. Umbraculoides.

Description
The stems of Hypericum umbraculoides are reddish and its bark is grey. Its growth rate and height are unknown.

Distribution
Hypericum umbraculoides is known to be found only in Oaxaca, Mexico, in arid to semiarid climates.

References

umbraculoides
Plants described in 1985
Flora of Oaxaca
Endemic flora of Mexico